Rajdowe Samochodowe Mistrzostwa Polski (RSMP) – the annual series of Polish Rally Championship existing from 1928. Consisting of several rounds on different surfaces throughout Poland. The organizer and owner of the cycle is Polski Związek Motorowy (PZM). In 2008 the main sponsor of the series is Orlen oil company and its full name is Platinum Rajdowe Samochodowe Mistrzostwa Polski (Platinum Car Rally Championship Polish).

A prerequisite for the start to RSMP is to have a rally license degree "R" or "R co-driver only" (entitles you to take off only as a co-driver). As of 2007, foreign drivers have been allowed to gain points.

History 

Rallies in Poland almost always were at a high level of security and organisation. The Second World War stopped high advancement of rallies. After the war Polish Rallies had problems. Just in 60s RSMP launched in high level. Great Polish drivers went to the conquest of Europe and Sobiesław Zasada has proved to be the best, he won three European Rally Championship titles (now World Rally Championship). He imported the latest sports cars, so he dominate of RSMP. In 1975 won title young driver Marian Bublewicz in Polski Fiat 125p from Olsztyn. Since then RSMP won different drivers: Tomasz Ciecierzyński, Włodzimierz Groblewski, Jerzy Landsberg, Błażej Krupa, Maciej Stawowiak, Tomasz Ciecierzyński.

In 1980s for a title fight Marian Bublewicz and Andrzej Koper. They imported Japanese sports cars and Renault. Only in 1987 Bublewicz won championship in Polonez 2000. so it was amazing. In 1989–1992 Bublewicz had no equal. In 1993 he purchased Ford Escort Cosworth for next title, but new car was not ready for the first in season Zimowy Rajd Dolnośląski. He started in hired Ford Sierra. For unknown reasons, he lost car and hit in tree. Marian Bublewicz died in hospital. Polish fans and PZM were shocked. Bublewicz's fatal crash caused work on security.

In 1990s for title going Paweł Przybylski, Krzysztof Hołowczyc, Robert Gryczyński and Janusz Kulig. All the leading drivers have top cars from World Rally Championship and rivalry was very hard.

This year

General classification

Polish Rally Champions 
After 1966

Multiple wins by individual

References

Rally racing series
Motorsport competitions in Poland
Rally